Bohdan Boychuk (born 30 May 1996) is a Ukrainian professional footballer who plays for Rukh Lviv.

Career
Boychuk is a product of the FC Olimpik Donetsk and Metalist Kharkiv Youth School Systems.

He made his debut for FC Metalist in the match against FC Dynamo Kyiv on 1 March 2015 in the Ukrainian Premier League.

References

External links
 
 

1996 births
Living people
Ukrainian footballers
FC Metalist Kharkiv players
Ukrainian Premier League players
Ukrainian First League players
Russian First League players
Moldovan Super Liga players
CSF Bălți players
Ukrainian expatriate footballers
Expatriate footballers in Moldova
Ukrainian expatriate sportspeople in Moldova
Expatriate footballers in Russia
Ukrainian expatriate sportspeople in Russia
Association football forwards
FC Dinamo-Auto Tiraspol players
FC Rukh Lviv players
FC Neftekhimik Nizhnekamsk players
Ukraine youth international footballers
Sportspeople from Kherson